Jimmy Pino (born 12 August 1978 in Cartagena) is a former Colombian sprinter who competed in the men's 200m at the 2000 Summer Olympics. He recorded a 21.42, good for 6th in his heat, but not enough to advance. His personal best in the 200m is 20.5, recorded in 2002.

References

Living people
1978 births
Colombian male sprinters
Athletes (track and field) at the 2000 Summer Olympics
Olympic athletes of Colombia
Sportspeople from Cartagena, Colombia
20th-century Colombian people